The 2015 Georgia Bulldogs football team represented the University of Georgia in the 2015 NCAA Division I FBS football season. The Bulldogs played their home games at Sanford Stadium. They were members of the Eastern Division of the Southeastern Conference. This was head coach Mark Richt's 15th and final season leading the program. Richt was relieved of his duties at the end of the regular season. Richt was originally slated to remain head coach for the team's bowl game, but he was replaced after he reached an agreement to become head coach of the Miami Hurricanes football team. Wide receivers coach Bryan McClendon was named interim head coach for the TaxSlayer Bowl against Penn State.  

After starting the season ranked in the top 10, the team completed a second straight 9–3 regular season, finishing third in the SEC East Division after losing to division rivals Florida and Tennessee, as well as a cross-division matchup with Alabama. After the Florida game, the team ended the regular season with a four-game win streak that included road wins over rivals Auburn and Georgia Tech, though it needed overtime to defeat Georgia Southern, a Sun Belt Conference team playing just its second season at the Football Bowl Subdivision level.

Previous season
The 2014 Georgia Bulldogs football team finished the regular season 9–3, with losses to South Carolina, Florida, and Georgia Tech. Even defeating Missouri 34–0, Georgia did not receive a bid to the SEC Championship due to the two SEC losses (Florida and South Carolina). Instead, one loss Missouri went to the SEC championship game. The Bulldogs became bowl eligible after their win against Arkansas and were invited to play in the Belk Bowl against the Louisville Cardinals of the Atlantic Coast Conference, a game they won, 37-14 to complete a 10-3 season.

Coaching changes
Offensive Coordinator Mike Bobo left his position to accept the head coaching job at Colorado State at the end of the 2014 season. Offensive line coach Will Friend joined Bobo's Colorado State staff as offensive coordinator. 

Bobo was replaced by Brian Schottenheimer, who was the St. Louis Rams Offensive Coordinator the previous 3 seasons. Schottenheimer was the Offensive Coordinator of the New York Jets from 2006-2011 and also coached Quarterbacks for the San Diego Chargers and Washington Redskins. Schottenheimer started playing college football at Kansas before transferring to Florida to play for Steve Spurrier from 1993-1996. Rob Sale was hired to coach the offensive line. Sale came from McNeese State where he coached the offensive line the previous 3 seasons.

After wide receivers coach Tony Ball took a position with LSU, Thomas Brown was hired from Wisconsin. Brown, who played running back at Georgia and coached the position at Wisconsin, replaced Bryan McClendon as running backs coach, with McClendon moving to coach wide receivers, the same position he played at Georgia.

Personnel

Coaching staff

Schedule
Georgia announced their 2015 football schedule on October 14, 2014. The 2015 schedule consisted of 7 home games, 4 away games and 1 neutral game in the regular season. The Bulldogs would host SEC foes Alabama, Kentucky, Missouri, and South Carolina, and would travel to Auburn, Tennessee, and Vanderbilt. Georgia would meet for the 93rd time with Florida in their annual neutral site rivalry game in Jacksonville, Florida.

The Bulldogs would host three non–conference foes: Louisiana–Monroe, Southern, and in–state rival Georgia Southern. Finally, at the last game of the regular season the Bulldogs would travel to Georgia Tech in Atlanta.

Schedule Source:

Game summaries

Louisiana–Monroe

Vanderbilt

South Carolina

Southern

Alabama

Tennessee

Missouri

Florida

Kentucky

Auburn

Georgia Southern

Georgia Tech

Rankings

References

Georgia
Georgia Bulldogs football seasons
Gator Bowl champion seasons
Georgia Bulldogs football